Melittommopsis is a genus of beetles in the family Lymexylidae, containing the following species:

Melittommopsis abdominalis (Pic, 1936)
Melittommopsis juquiensis Lane, 1955
Melittommopsis nigra Lane, 1955
Melittommopsis ruficollis (Pic, 1936)
Melittommopsis valida (Schenkling, 1914)

References

External links

Cucujoidea genera
Lymexylidae